Liu Shaozhuo (born 31 October 1990) is a Chinese former professional tennis player.

A left-handed player born in Tianjin, Liu reached a best singles ranking of 434 in the world and won an ITF title in Manila in 2009. She won a further ITF title in 2010 as a doubles player, a $25,000 tournament in Fuzhou, partnering Xu Yifan.

Liu made her only WTA Tour main draw appearance at the 2010 Guangzhou International Women's Open, where she and Chinese Taipei's Chen Yi were beaten in the first round by Olga Savchuk and Tamarine Tanasugarn, in a match tiebreak.

ITF finals

Singles: 1 (1–0)

Doubles: 1 (1–0)

References

External links
 
 

1990 births
Living people
Chinese female tennis players
Tennis players from Tianjin
21st-century Chinese women